Pedachtoë or Pedachthoe, also known as Heracleopolis or Herakleioupolis, was a town of ancient Pontus, inhabited during Roman and Byzantine times. It was assigned to the late Roman province of Armenia Prima, in which it became the seat of an archbishop. No longer a residential see, it remains a titular see of the Roman Catholic Church.

Its site is tentatively located near Akşehir in Asiatic Turkey.

References

Populated places in ancient Pontus
Catholic titular sees in Asia
Former populated places in Turkey
Roman towns and cities in Turkey
Populated places of the Byzantine Empire
Populated places in ancient Lesser Armenia
History of Sivas Province